Thanasis Pantos (born 9 October 1998) is a Greek professional footballer who plays as a goalkeeper for Super League 2 club Kallithea.

Honours
AEK Athens
Super League: 2017–18

References

1998 births
Living people
Super League Greece players
Football League (Greece) players
Gamma Ethniki players
AEK Athens F.C. players
Acharnaikos F.C. players
A.E. Sparta P.A.E. players
Kalamata F.C. players
Ethnikos Piraeus F.C. players
Kallithea F.C. players
Association football goalkeepers
Footballers from Athens
Greek footballers